The 2007–07 season was the 110th season of competitive football by Heart of Midlothian, and their 24th consecutive season in the top level of Scottish football, competing in the Scottish Premier League. Hearts also competed in the Champions League, UEFA Cup, Scottish Cup and Scottish League Cup.

Managers

Valdas Ivanauskas was confirmed as head coach on a permanent basis during the summer of 2006 following the Scottish Cup victory.

Following an inconsistent start to their League campaign, head coach Valdas Ivanauskas took a sabbatical from his role on 23 October. Eduard Malofeev was appointed interim head coach until Valdas Ivanauskas later in the season although he only resumed the role for a short time before becoming director of football once again an interim head couch was required and previous director of football Anatoly Korobochka took charge of the team.

First team squad
Squad at end of season

Left club during season

Matches

Pre season
Hearts travelled to Austria for a pre season tour

Champions League

Hearts played their home 2006/2007 European Champions League games at Murrayfield Stadium, rather than in their home ground Tynecastle. A combination of Tynecastle falling short of UEFA requirements in terms of pitch size and hospitality facilities, and Murrayfield's greater capacity, meant that Murrayfield was the preferred choice for the Tynecastle board. Hearts won their second round qualifying tie against Bosnian champions Široki Brijeg 3–0 on aggregate, but were defeated 5–1 on aggregate by AEK Athens in the final qualifying round. The Greek side won 2–1 at Murrayfield due to two late goals and then won 3–0 in the Athens Olympic Stadium. Hearts had one player (Bruno Aguiar) sent off in the first leg and two players (Julien Brellier and Neil McCann) sent off in the second leg.

UEFA Cup

The loss in the final qualifying round meant that Hearts dropped into the UEFA Cup first round against Sparta Prague. In this competition they lost 2–0 at a muddy Murrayfield in the first leg and they were eliminated after a 0–0 draw in Prague in the return leg on 28 September 2006.

League Cup

Scottish Cup

Scottish Premier League

Following an indifferent start to their League campaign, head coach Valdas Ivanauskas took a sabbatical from his role on 23 October. Club owner Vladimir Romanov, who stated "I have full confidence in Valdas and look forward to his return", appointed the club's sporting director, Eduard Malofeev, as interim head coach. Further off-field disruption ensued four days later when Romanov warned his players that they would all be put up for sale if Hearts did not win their match against Dunfermline Athletic the next day. Captain Steven Pressley, flanked by senior players Paul Hartley and Craig Gordon, responded with a statement voicing the players' unhappiness at affairs at the club, stating in a pre-match media conference ahead of Dunfermline's visit that there was "significant unrest" in the dressing room. The game was drawn 1–1.

The repercussions from the press conference stretched over several months and eventually led to the departure from the club of two of the so-called Riccarton Three. Pressley was dropped for a match against Falkirk on 13 November and 
named as an unused substitute for a 1–0 defeat by Rangers on 19 November. Hartley was only used as a substitute in the former game. Pressley eventually left Hearts on 9 December, with accompanying press releases stating that this was an amicable agreement. He joined rivals Celtic on 1 January 2007 and captained his new squad to a 2–1 victory at Tynecastle on his first return to Edinburgh. Hartley also moved to Celtic during January 2007, in a £1.1 million transfer on 31 January. This only left Gordon, who was dropped for matches away to Dundee United and Rangers in December and January respectively, as the only member of the trio to remain at Hearts beyond the January transfer window.

Hearts failed to win a game under the management of Eduard Malofeev, who took control during Ivanauskas' sabbatical. Hearts lost at Celtic and Hibernian – a result which eliminated Hearts from the CIS Cup – and at home to Rangers. He remained as caretaker manager until late November 2006 when, despite media reports anticipating the appointment of Eugenijus Riabovas, Ivanauskas returned to resume his duties as club manager.

A 1–0 loss in the Scottish Cup at Dunfermline on 3 February 2007, with Gordon on the bench, ended Hearts' chance to retain the trophy. Later that month, Ivanauskas was moved to a director of football role, with director of football Anatoly Korobochka assuming the role of interim head coach on 2 March. An improved run of form towards the end of the season witnessed Hearts challenge Aberdeen for third spot in the League and UEFA Cup qualification. The Dons scored a last minute equaliser in a head-to-head confrontation between the two teams at Tynecastle in May, and eventually finished four points clear in third place.

Final table

Transfers

On the eve of the SPL season, Hearts announced the capture of Chile striker Mauricio Pinilla on a season-long loan. PAOK Salonika's Christos Karipidis and Tiago Costa, a full back from Benfica B were also signed, while in the final week of the transfer window three further Lithuanian players – Marius Žaliūkas, Kęstutis Ivaškevičius and Andrius Velička – joined on loan from FBK Kaunas. Hearts fans still anticipated the arrival of "two World Cup stars" but were left disappointed when the club announced that the final piece of business of the transfer window would be to sign the previously-loaned striker Roman Bednář on a permanent deal.

See also
List of Heart of Midlothian F.C. seasons

References

External links 
2006–07 Heart of Midlothian F.C. season at ESPN

Heart of Midlothian
Heart of Midlothian F.C. seasons